Langdi was a script commonly used by traders used to write Haryanvi, Punjabi, or Saraiki in the Indian subcontinent . Bookkeepers, known as munīm, would also keep records in this script.

Some scholars have claimed that Langdi is a form of Mahajani for writing in parts of Haryana. Its proper connection must be more thoroughly explored.

References

Hindi
Punjabi language
Writing systems of Asia
Accounting in India
Punjabi culture